Lethe visrava, the white-edged woodbrown, is a species of satyrine butterfly found in Asia, where it is known from Sikkim to Bhutan, Assam and Burma.

References

visrava
Butterflies described in 1866